This is a list of weapons used by the Nationalist faction of the Spanish Civil War. The Nationalist faction won the Spanish Civil War.

Small arms

Rifles 

 Mauser Model 1893
 Gewehr 98
 Mannlicher M1895
 Mannlicher M1888
 M1870 Italian Vetterli

Sidearms 

 Astra 400
 Astra 900
 Mauser C96

Machine guns 

 Hotchkiss Mle 1914 machine gun
MG 08
Chauchat (captured)

Submachine guns 

 MP 28 SMG
 Erma EMP

Artillery

Field artillery 

 Canon de 75 modèle 1897
7.5 cm FK 16 nA
 10.5 cm leFH 16
 10.5 cm leFH 18

 Cannone da 75/27 modello 11
 Cannone da 75/27 modello 12
 Cannone da 105/28 modello 1913
 Obice da 100/17 Mod. 14

Heavy artillery 

 15 cm sFH 13
 Canon de 155 C modèle 1917 Schneider
 Obice da 149/12

Mountain artillery 

 Cannone da 65/17 modello 13

Anti-tank guns 

 3.7 cm Pak 36
 Bofors 37 mm anti-tank gun

Anti-aircraft guns 

 2 cm Flak 30
 7.5 cm Flak. L/60
 8.8 cm Flak 18
 Breda Model 35

Armoured fighting vehicles (AFV's) 

 List of tanks in the Spanish Civil War
 BA-3/6 (captured)

References

Weapons of Spain
Weapons,Nationalists
Lists of weapons
Weapons by war